Fallen Gods may refer to:

Books
Fallen Gods, a novel by Quintin Jardine, 2003
Fallen Gods (novella), by Jonathan Blum and Kate Orman
Fallen Gods, Star Trek: Titan, written by Michael A. Martin (2012)

Other
Fallen Gods (film) a 2008 film by Cuban filmmaker Ernesto Daranas; see List of Cuban submissions for the Academy Award for Best Foreign Language Film
Fallen Gods, an album by Rapoon (1994)